Kensit is a surname of Olde English, pre-7th-century origins.  It derives from a locality, probably either Kingsettle in Somerset, which translates as "the seat of the King", and is believed to relate to Alfred the Great, or possibly Kingside in Cumberland, or to some now lost village or town with a similar spelling.

Notable people with the surname Kensit include:

 John Kensit (1853–1902), English religious leader and polemicist
 Patsy Kensit (born 1968), English actress
 Louisa Bolus née Kensit (1877–1970), South African botanist

See also
John Frederick Kensett (1816–1872), American artist and engraver
Kenseth, surname